Pascal Brodnicki (born. 5 September 1976 in France) is a Polish-French cook.

Born in France, he worked in many famous restaurants (Chelsea Hotel in London, or Les Pyrénées in France).

He currently lives in Poland. He hosts a TV program "Pascal: Po prostu gotuj! in TVN. He released two books: Po prostu gotuj and Po prostu mi to ugotuj.

References

External links

 Official site and blog of Pascal Brodnicki 
 Pascal Brodnicki 'Cooking is an art'

1976 births
Living people
Polish television chefs